Gartrell Godfrey Johnson, III (born June 21, 1986) is a former American football running back. He was drafted by the San Diego Chargers in the fourth round of the 2009 NFL Draft. He played college football at Colorado State. Johnson has also played for the New York Giants and Atlanta Falcons.

Early years
As a senior at Miami Springs High School in 2003, he was Dade County's leading rusher with 1,649 yards and accounted for 18 touchdowns.  For his performance, he earned all-Conference and all-State honors and also holds Miami Springs High's single-season rushing record, especially significant considering that Miami Springs was also the high school attended by Willis McGahee, Mitch Green, Jon Lewis, Dwayne Hadley, and Freddie Myles.  Buddy Goins was his coach at MSHS.

College career
He ended his five-year career at CSU with an outstanding 2008 campaign for which he received first-team All-MWC honors. Johnson accounted for over 3,000 yards of total offense and 26 touchdowns in his college career. Johnson became the first player to lead CSU in rushing for three straight seasons since E.J. Watson (1993–95), and recorded CSU's first 1,000-yard season since Kyle Bell in 2005.<ref>Colorado State Rams bio</</ref> He showed an astonishing performance in the 2008 New Mexico Bowl when he rushed for 286 yards and two touchdowns, also receiving five passes for 90 yards, he sealed the game on a 77-yard touchdown with 1:46 remaining earning Offensive MVP honors. His 375 all-purpose yards ranks second all-time in a bowl game, behind East Carolina's Chris Johnson, who had 408 all-purpose yards; 153 in kickoff returns in the 2007 Hawaii Bowl. He was named Team’s Fum McGraw MVP as senior.<ref>Colorado State Rams bio</</ref>

Statistics

Professional career
Johnson was drafted by the San Diego Chargers in the fourth round (134th overall) in the 2009 NFL Draft.

Pre-draft

San Diego Chargers
Johnson was drafted by the San Diego Chargers in the fourth round of the 2009 NFL Draft.  After being inactive for the Chargers first game of the season, he was waived on September 14, 2009.

New York Giants
Johnson was claimed off waivers by the New York Giants on September 15, 2009.  Johnson recorded his first regular season NFL carry with the Giants in 2009.  He finished the year averaging 3.3 yards per carry; gaining 43 yards on 13 rushing attempts.

Atlanta Falcons
Johnson signed with the Atlanta Falcons on September 21, 2010. In the 2010 season, Gartrell carried the ball 10 times for 36 yards.  He was waived on September 2, 2011.

References

External links
Official Site
Colorado State Rams bio
New York Giants bio
San Diego Chargers bio

1986 births
Living people
American football running backs
Atlanta Falcons players
Colorado State Rams football players
New York Giants players
Players of American football from Miami
San Diego Chargers players
Miami Springs Senior High School alumni